Sérgio Miguel Moreira Paulinho, ComIH (born 26 March 1980) is a Portuguese road bicycle racer, who currently rides for UCI Continental team . He was a domestique in the 2007, 2009 and 2010 Tour de France and won the silver medal for Portugal in the 2004 Athens Olympic Games.

Career
Paulinho was born in Oeiras. After winning a bronze medal in the 2002 UCI Road World Championships, in under-23, in 2003, he became a professional cyclist and started gaining reference in one of the most important Portuguese teams . In 2004, he was 6th in the Volta a Portugal, winning two stages, including the final Individual time trial. In the 2004 Athens Olympic Games, he was silver medalist (Italy's Paolo Bettini got gold and Axel Merckx bronze) in the cycling road race. In 2004 he also won the Portuguese National Time Trial Championships and stages 7 and 10 of the Volta a Portugal.

Following his Olympic performance, he was signed by the  team. He was implicated in the Operación Puerto doping case but was later cleared by Spanish officials of any links to the Operación Puerto doping case. He took his first Grand Tour stage win in the 2006 Vuelta a España, on stage 10. He joined the  team at the end of the season.

In 2008, he again won the Portuguese National Time Trial Championships. He joined Lance Armstrong's  in 2010, along with fellow countrymen Tiago Machado and directeur sportif José Azevedo. On 14 July 2010, he won the 10th stage of the Tour de France.

Major results

2002
 Volta a Portugal
1st Prologue, Stages 3 & 4
 3rd  Time trial, UCI World Under-23 Road Championships
 10th Road race, UEC European Under-23 Road Championships
2003
 9th Overall Volta a Portugal
2004
 1st  Time trial, National Road Championships
 1st Overall Volta a Tras os Montes
1st Stage 1
 1st Stage 3 Volta a Terras de Santa Maria
 2nd  Road race, Olympic Games
 6th Overall Volta a Portugal
1st Stages 7 & 10 (ITT)
 7th Overall Troféu Joaquim Agostinho
2006
 1st Stage 10 Vuelta a España
2008
 1st  Time trial, National Road Championships
2009
 1st Stage 4 (TTT) Tour de France
2010
 1st Stage 10 Tour de France
2012
 6th GP Miguel Induráin
2013
 2nd Overall Tour of Norway
2016
 1st Stage 5 (TTT) Tour of Croatia
2017
 2nd Clássica da Arrábida
 3rd Time trial, National Road Championships
 4th Clássica Aldeias do Xisto
 7th Overall Troféu Joaquim Agostinho
 9th Overall Volta a Portugal
2018
 8th Clássica Aldeias do Xisto
2019
 3rd Overall Troféu Joaquim Agostinho

Grand Tour general classification results timeline

References

External links

Profile at Team Radioshack

1980 births
Living people
People from Oeiras, Portugal
Portuguese male cyclists
Portuguese expatriate cyclists
Portuguese Tour de France stage winners
Portuguese Vuelta a España stage winners
Cyclists at the 2004 Summer Olympics
Olympic cyclists of Portugal
Olympic silver medalists for Portugal
Olympic medalists in cycling
Medalists at the 2004 Summer Olympics
2010 Tour de France stage winners
Portuguese expatriate sportspeople in Spain
Sportspeople from Lisbon District